The Delaware County Bureau of Park Police is a county-wide police force, responsible for providing police services and fire safety for all parks, trails, physical property, and government buildings of Delaware County, Pennsylvania. This is the only police department in Delaware County that has county-wide jurisdiction, as every municipality has either its own police department or is patrolled by the Pennsylvania State Police.

The Bureau has 78 sworn police officers in the department who maintain foot and vehicle patrols twenty-four hours a day, throughout the year. The department also employs one Civilian Security & Fire Safety Specialist along with three fire safety officers  (Fire Marshalls), and one Administrative Assistant. The officers continue their training through in-service training, as well as courses offered by the District Attorney's Office, the Police Academy at Delaware County Community College as well as numerous training locations around the area.

All officers are required to qualify annually with their firearms in accordance with the course approved by the Delaware County Police Chief's Association. In addition, the Delaware County Park Police Training Division has certified use of force, firearms instructors and rangemasters and all officers have been certified in basic First Aid and CPR, AED, and Narcan.

The department's Detective Division is responsible for investigating criminal activities that occur on county property, assisting patrol division with preparation of criminal complaints, and investigating motor vehicle accidents and property damage when requested by the solicitor. 

The force provides police services for the Department of Special Events and handles approximately 170,000 vehicles with over 500,000 visitors who visit Delaware County parks yearly. In addition, the department is responsible for the issuance of identification cards for all county employees and persons utilizing said properties and facilities.

The Chief of Park Police is John Diehl.

Organization
The Bureau has two divisions:

Operations & Administration Division
Special Operations Division

Operations & Administration Division 

This comprises the following units:

Patrol Division
Training Unit
Equipment & Fleet

Special Operations Division 

This comprises the following units.

Detective Division
Special Response Team
Training Unit
Fire Safety
Emergency Management & Planning
Security and Safety Specialist

Staff

Officers hold the following ranks:

Command staff: Superintendent, Captain of Police, Detective/Lieutenant, Lieutenants
Supervisory staff: Detective / Sergeant, Sergeants, Corporals
Police officers: Patrolmen and Detective / Investigator

Responsibilities
The Bureau is responsible for policing the following:

Courthouse and Government Center Complex
Fair Acres Complex
Chester Regional Court
Chester Division of Adult and Juvenile Probation 
Chester Wharf - Election Bureau
Eddystone Division of Children and Youth Services
Human Services Department in Upper Darby
Upper Darby Division of Adult and Juvenile Probation
Darby Township Division of Adult and Juvenile Probation
Delaware County Emergency Services Training Center
Health and Wellness Center Yeadon
All County owned Parks and Trails

Chief Deihl is also responsible for overseeing the Delaware County Constable Transport Team.  The team consists of two State Constables and one Administrative Assistant.  The Constable Transport Team works with the elected State Constable within Delaware County for transportation of detainees to Court Appearances at the Magisterial District Courts in Delaware County.

Fallen officers

See also

 List of law enforcement agencies in Pennsylvania

References

External links
Delaware County Courthouse and Park Police Department

County police departments of Pennsylvania
Specialist police departments of Pennsylvania
Park police departments of the United States